is a Japanese television tarento and news anchor. She is a Visiting Professor of the Graduate Institute for Entrepreneurial Studies. She is represented by Sankei.

Biography
She was born in Itoigawa, Niigata. She graduated from Niigata High School and Tokyo Woman's Christian University Faculty of Literature English and American literature. She is also from the Graduate Institute for Entrepreneurial Studies. Former announcer Chika Watanabe, belonging to Nagoya Broadcasting Network, was her classmate at Tokyo Women's University.

In 1989, while she was in college, she appeared as a reporter at TBS's Sunday Morning. After working as a broadcaster for widely viewed programs such as Super Morning and Best Time, she studied at Fordham University in New York City for one year in 2002. While serving as a visiting professor at the Graduate School of Business Creation in 2010, she has served as "Ambassador of Itoigawa Geopark" together with members of the MEXT "Committee on Research and Development in Nuclear Power" committee, Shunichi Kawai and Masaru Nagai. In addition to this, she also appeared at lectures and symposia.

Current appearance programmes

Former appearances

Advertisement appearances

References

External links
 
 
 
 (August 2010 – ) 

Japanese television journalists
People from Niigata Prefecture
1967 births
Living people